Vincenzo Barone (b. 8 November 1952, Ancona) is an Italian chemist, active in the field of theoretical and computational chemistry. 

He became full professor of physical chemistry at the University of Naples in 1994, and professor of theoretical and computational chemistry at the Scuola Normale Superiore di Pisa in 2009.

He was elected director of the Scuola Normale in 2016 but resigned in 2019 after a clash with the body of professors, that would have resulted in a no confidence vote. 

He has been chairperson of the Italian Chemical Society (SCI) from 2011 to 2013 and is also a member of the International Academy of Quantum Molecular Science (IAQMS), the European Academy of Sciences, and a fellow of the Royal Society of Chemistry (RSC).

See also
Martin Suhm
Stefan Grimme
Roman Balabin

References

Literature
Alex Saragosa: La chimica cambia la sua formula // Il Venerdì di Repubblica, 25 March 2011.

1952 births
Living people
Italian chemists
Academic staff of the Scuola Normale Superiore di Pisa
People from Ancona
Fellows of the Royal Society of Chemistry
Computational chemists
Theoretical chemists
Academic staff of the University of Naples Federico II
Members of the International Academy of Quantum Molecular Science